is a Japanese women's professional shogi player ranked 1-kyū. She is a member of the Ladies Professional Shogi-players' Association of Japan.

Promotion history
Hori has been promoted as follows:

 3-kyū: August 2016
 2-kyū: March 1, 1017
 1-kyū: October 1, 1019

Note: All ranks are women's professional ranks.

References

1993 births
Living people
Japanese shogi players
Women's professional shogi players
Professional shogi players from Kōchi Prefecture
LPSA